More Than You Know is the debut studio album by Swedish electronic dance music duo Axwell & Ingrosso, released on 8 December 2017 through Axtone Records, Refune Music, Virgin Records and Def Jam Recordings.

Background
The album was in the making since 2014. It was stated numerous times that it would be released in November 2016 and February 2017, although this never came to fruition. The album contains all of Axwell and Ingrosso's previously released singles. The songs "Can't Hold Us Down" and "Something New" were previously released on their EP X4, while the songs "More Than You Know", "Renegade", "How Do You Feel Right Now" and "Dawn" were released on their EP More Than You Know.

Track listing
Credits adapted from iTunes, Qobuz and Spotify.

Charts

Weekly charts

Year-end charts

Certifications

References

2017 debut albums
Axwell & Ingrosso albums